Arnoun (Syriac-Aramaic: ܐܪܢܘܢ) is a majority Lebanese Shia village  south-east of Nabatiyeh, in Nabatiyeh Governorate, southern Lebanon. The village is approximately 550 metres (1,800 feet) above sea level, and approximately one kilometre (0.62 miles) from the Beaufort Castle.

The noted academic and commentator Fouad Ajami was born in Arnoun.

History

Arnoun is linked to the nearby Beaufort Castle. The town's name is derived from the Aramaic arnoun, meaning "little top", referring to the highland where the Beaufort Castle stands. The castle itself was referred to as Qal'at Shqif Arnoun (Aramaic: the castle of the high rock on the hill), from which the town took its name.

In 1875 Victor Guérin  noted that it contained one hundred "Metualis".

Modern era

After the establishment of the Israeli Security Zone in southern Lebanon in 1985, Arnoun lay just outside its boundaries, although, from its position at the Beaufort Castle, the Israel Defense Forces (IDF) effectively controlled the village.

On February 17, 1999, after Israel alleged that attacks on IDF forces were launched from Arnoun, the village was formally incorporated into the Security Zone. Most of the village’s 2,000 inhabitants had left in November 1998 when Hizbullah increased the number of operations in the area. In the subsequent months the IDF had demolished twenty-two houses. On February 18 IDF and SLA forces erected fences and laid minefields around the village. The thirty-five remaining villagers were left with a 3km track as their only access. In response, two days later, Hizbullah attacked SLA positions in Jezzine killing one militiaman and blowing up buildings. Then on the night of 22/23 February Hizbullah killed three IDF officers, including a major, in an ambush which led to a three-hour firefight.

On February 28, 1999, two thousand university students, from all over Lebanon, followed by local demonstrators, broke through the fence surrounding Aroun. The following day government bulldozers restored access to the village. The IDF did not immediately attempt to retake the village but was left with a dilemma since Aroun overlooked the road which the army used to supply its strategic base in Beaufort Castle.

Two weeks later, 14-15 March, the IDF retook the Arnoun. A force of twenty soldiers backed by tanks and APCs entered the village firing tear gas and shooting over the heads of assembled journalists. One photographer was wounded. After clearing the village and restoring the fencing the IDF installed a SLA checkpoint at the entrance.

The IDF left Arnoun on May 24, 2000, when it withdrew from the Security Zone.

Notable residents
Fouad Ajami, university professor and writer on Middle Eastern issues
Borhane Alaouié, movie maker

References

Bibliography

External links
Arnoun, Localiban

Populated places in Nabatieh District
Shia Muslim communities in Lebanon